Maria Sèthe at the Harmonium is an oil on canvas painting by the Belgian neo-impressionist painter Théo van Rysselberghe. The painting depicts a woman with blonde, worn-up hair and a purple dress staring dreamily into space, while smiling. The sitter was Maria Sèthe, who belonged to an affluent musical family with an interest in the arts. In the painting, she is depicted sitting at a harmonium, but she's not playing it. 

The painting shows the influence of Seurat on van Rysselberghe, the latter's adoption of Seurat’s pointillism, and his rejection of Seurat’s style and simplification.

Painting

The paintings depicts Maria Sèthe, who later married the modernist architect, painter, designer and exponent of Art Nouveau Henry Van de Velde, sitting on a chair while gazing dreamily off. The woman is smiling. She's sitting at a harmonium, but she's not playing it. The head of a cello rises up behind it. The harmonium, the cello and the work of art point the social status of the wealthy Sèthe family and their musical interests.

The painting is signed VTR at the top, along with the date of the portrait.

Seurat’s influence and van Rysselberghe's style

Van Rysselberghe, as a Belgian, was imbued with the portrait tradition of Dutch and Flemish masters, and as a 19th-century artist, he was attuned to the artistic tastes of the bourgeoisie.

In 1886, Van Rysselberghe visited the Impressionist exhibition in Paris. There, he discovered the work of the French artist Georges Seurat, and thereupon embraced Neo-Impressionism.

The Pointillists used a technique in which small, distinct dots of primary color are applied in patterns to form an image.

The practice of Pointillism is in sharp contrast to the traditional methods of blending pigments on a palette. Because of the way the human brain works, the viewer then perceives a secondary color. Placing red and yellow stipples next to each other, for instance, makes us see orange. The painting technique used for Pointillist color mixing is at the expense of the traditional brushwork used to delineate texture. 

Strict color theory and systematic method were applied less stringently after Seurat’s death. The brushwork became more personal and expressive. Color became increasingly important. There was more room for personal insight and a less analytical approach. In this way, Pointillism eventually led to the birth of 20th-century modernism.

Van Rysselberghe painted little dots for expressive parts, such as hands and face. The rest of the work was done with larger touches. Further, he did not adopt Seurat’s style and simplification. Van Rysselberghe continued to work realistically and paid a lot of attention to volume, light and shadow. His pointillist paintings create a bright, almost luminous impression. In this instance, the purple of Maria Sèthe's dress is overwhelming. Equally attractive is the blonde hair realized in yellow and orange, complementary colours of purple and blue.

References

1891 paintings
Paintings in the collection of the Royal Museum of Fine Arts Antwerp
Paintings by Théo van Rysselberghe
Musical instruments in art
Post-impressionist paintings
Paintings of women